Otto Necas was an Austrian football player and coach.

As player he was a striker and became a prolific goalscorer during the 1910s.  He played with 1. Simmeringer SC in the 1913/14 season.  Then he played with SC Rudolfshügel between 1915 and 1925.  In the 1917–18 Austrian championship he ended up the season as the second league top-scorer with 14 goals.  Besides SC Rudolfshügel, he played in another Austrian top-flight club, ASV Hertha Wien, in the season 1918–19 Austrian championship.

In 1917 he played for the team of Lower-Austria against Bohemia.  In 1918 he played for the Vienna selection against Kraków.

Later he became a coach and managed Yugoslav side FK Vojvodina on two occasions 1926 and 1930. Before coming to Vojvodina he coached for a brief period SK Soko a club from the Yugoslav capital Belgrade.

Seasons
League statistics:
 1913/14: 1. Simmeringer SC league statistics 1913/14 at austriasoccer.at
 1915/16: SC Rudolfshügel league statistics 1915/16 at austriasoccer.at - He was 3rd league topscorer with 19 goals.
 1916/17: SC Rudolfshügel league statistics 1916/17 at austriasoccer.at - He was a 3rd league topscorer with 16 goals.
 1917/18: SC Rudolfshügel league statistics 1917/18 at austriasoccer.at - He was 2nd league topscorer with 14 goals.
 1918/19: Hertha Wien league statistics 1918/19 at austriasoccer.at
 1918/19: SC Rudolfshügel league statistics 1918/19 at austriasoccer.at
 1919/20: SC Rudolfshügel league statistics 1919/20 at austriasoccer.at
 1920/21:  SC Rudolfshügel league statistics 1920/21 at austriasoccer.at
 1921/22: SC Rudolfshügel league statistics 1921/22 at austriasoccer.at
 1922/23: SC Rudolfshügel league statistics 1922/23 at austriasoccer.at
 1923/24: missing
 1924/25: SC Rudolfshügel league statistics 1924/25 at austriasoccer.at

References

Austrian footballers
Association football forwards
1. Simmeringer SC players
Austrian football managers
FK Vojvodina managers
Austrian expatriate sportspeople in Yugoslavia
Expatriate football managers in Yugoslavia
Year of birth missing